Scott Davis and Broderick Dyke were the defending champions, but did not participate this year.

Richard Fromberg and Brad Pearce won the title, defeating Brian Garrow and Sven Salumaa 6–2, 3–6, 7–6 in the final.

Seeds

  Steve DeVries /  Bret Garnett (first round)
  Brian Garrow /  Sven Salumaa (final)
  Martín Jaite /  Alberto Mancini (quarterfinals)
  Marius Barnard /  Royce Deppe (quarterfinals)

Draw

Draw

References
Draw

OTB Open
OTB International Open